Dongguan railway station (Chinese: 东莞站; Pinyin: Dōngguǎn Zhàn), also known as New Shilong railway station (Chinese: 	新石龙站; Pinyin: Xīn Shílóng Zhàn) is a railway station on the Guangzhou–Shenzhen Railway, located between Chashan and Shilong, Dongguan, Guangdong in China. The station is designed by He Jingtang, a prominent Chinese architect and professor at the South China University of Technology's school of architecture. It started to operate on January 8, 2014, which replaced Shilong railway station for the passenger train services.

This station has Guangzhou-Shenzhen intercity Multiple unit train (CRH) services and long-distance train services. It also connected with Line 2 of the Dongguan Rail Transit.

References

Railway stations in Guangdong
Railway stations in China opened in 2014
Stations on the Guangzhou–Shenzhen Railway